The following is a list of dams in Tokyo, Japan.

List

See also

References 

Tokyo